Kaiserspiel, also called Kaisern or Cheisärä, is a card game, usually for 4 or 6 players, that is played in parts of Switzerland using a variant of the standard Swiss playing cards with 40 or 48 cards. It is a descendant of Karnöffel, one of the oldest card games known. It is sometimes misleadingly called Kaiserjass,  although it has nothing to do with the Jass family of games that are popular in Switzerland.

Cards 
The Kaiserspiel pack comprises four suits: Shields, Flowers, Bells and Acorns each of ten cards ranked as follows: King, Ober, Unter, Banner, (9), (8), 7, 6, 5, 4, 3, 2 (Deuce). The four Banners are normally part of the trump suit and are known as Kaisers, hence the name of the game. In the 40-card variants, the 8s and 9s are removed. There are no Aces.

References

External links 
 Matthew Macfadyen and Kirsty Healey, rev. John McLeod. Kaiserspiel at www.pagat.com. Retrieved 4 Jun 2018.

Swiss deck card games
Karnöffel group
Four-player card games
Six-player card games
Swiss card games